CFU-Meg is a colony forming unit.
Haematopoiesis in the bone marrow starts off from a haematopoietic stem cell (HSC) and this can differentiate into the myeloid and lymphoid cell lineages. In order to eventually produce a megakaryocyte, the haematopoietic stem cell must generate myeloid cells, so it becomes a common myeloid progenitor, CFU-GEMM. This in turn develops into CFU-Meg, which is the colony forming unit that leads to the production of megakaryocytes.

Some sources prefer the term "CFU-Mega".

See also
 Thrombopoietin

References

External links
 

Blood cells
Colony forming units